Jordan Teze (born 30 September 1999) is a Dutch professional footballer who plays as a right-back for Eredivisie club PSV and the Netherlands national team.

Personal life
Born in the Netherlands, Teze is of Congolese descent.

Professional career
Teze was first promoted to the PSV senior team in 2019. On May 29, 2022, PSV Eindhoven announced that they had extended Teze's contract through 2025.

International career
He represented Netherlands at the 2016 UEFA European Under-17 Championship and the 2021 UEFA European Under-21 Championship, the Netherlands reached the semi-finals in both of those tournaments.

He was called up to the senior Netherlands squad for the friendly matches against Denmark and Germany on 26 and 29 March 2022, respectively. On 8 June 2022, Teze earned his first cap for the Dutch national team, playing 90 minutes in a 2-1 UEFA Nations League win over Wales.

Career statistics

Club

Honours
PSV
KNVB Cup: 2021–22
Johan Cruyff Shield: 2021, 2022

References

External links
 Profile at the PSV Eindhoven website

1999 births
Living people
Footballers from Groningen (city)
Dutch footballers
Netherlands youth international footballers
Netherlands under-21 international footballers
Dutch people of Republic of the Congo descent
Association football defenders
Eredivisie players
Eerste Divisie players
PSV Eindhoven players
Jong PSV players